Andeabatis is a monotypic moth genus of the family Hepialidae. The only species is Andeabatis chilensis of southern South America.

References

External links
Hepialidae genera

Hepialidae
Monotypic moth genera
Taxa named by Ebbe Nielsen
Exoporia genera
Moths of South America